Stephan Auer (born 11 January 1991) is an Austrian footballer who plays for First Vienna.

Club career
On 28 September 2020, he returned to Admira Wacker.

On 21 January 2022, Auer signed a 1.5-year contract with First Vienna.

References

1991 births
Living people
Footballers from Vienna
Austrian footballers
Association football defenders
SV Schwechat players
FC Admira Wacker Mödling players
SK Rapid Wien players
First Vienna FC players
Austrian Football Bundesliga players
Austrian Regionalliga players